The 2008–09 Mid-American Conference men's basketball season began with practices in October 2008, followed by the start of the 2008–09 NCAA Division I men's basketball season in November. Conference play began in January 2009 and concluded in March 2009. Bowling Green and Buffalo shared the regular season title with a conference record of 11–5. Fifth-seeded Akron defeated Buffalo in the MAC tournament final and represented the MAC in the NCAA tournament where they lost in the first round to Gonzaga.

Preseason awards
The preseason poll was announced by the league office on October 30, 2008.

Preseason men's basketball poll
(First place votes in parenthesis)

East Division
 Kent State (16) 124
  (6) 109
 Bowling Green 70
 Akron 67
 Ohio 66
 Buffalo 35

West Division
 Western Michigan (15) 122
 Eastern Michigan (7) 105
 Central Michigan 79
  71
 Ball State 55
 Northern Illinois 39

Tournament champs
Kent State (11), Miami (7), Bowling Green (2), Eastern Michigan (2)

Honors

Postseason

Mid–American tournament

NCAA tournament

Postseason awards

Coach of the Year: Louis Orr, Bowling Green
Player of the Year: Michael Bramos, Miami
Freshman of the Year: Jarrod Jones, Ball State
Defensive Player of the Year:  Nate Linhart, Akron
Sixth Man of the Year: Brett McKnight, Akron

Honors

See also
2008–09 Mid-American Conference women's basketball season

References